Vanessa Grant is a Canadian writer of romance novels, having had 29 published from 1985 to 2001. Her books have been translated into 15 languages and she has over 10 million books in print.

In 1997 she wrote a manual of writing: Writing Romance and now she is an international lecturer.

Biography
Grant wrote 29 romance novels from 1985 to 2001. Her books have been translated into 15 languages and she has over 10 million books in print. In 1997 she wrote a manual of writing: Writing Romance.

Grant has become an international lecturer who has given workshops to writers' groups in Canada and the United States. In August 2001 she was the featured speaker at the Romance Writers of Australia and Romance Writers of New Zealand's annual conferences.

Grant lives with her husband on Vancouver Island.

Bibliography

Single novels
Pacific Disturbance (1985)
Storm (1985)
Shadows (1986)
The Chauvinist (1987)
Stranded Heart (1988)
Taking Chances (1989)
Awakening Dreams (1989)
Wild Passage (1989)
So Much for Dreams (1990)
The Touch of Love (1990)
Angela's Affair (1991)
Hidden Memories (1992)
Catalina's Lover (1992)
Nothing Less Than Love (1992)
After All This Time (1992)
Strangers by Day (1993)
Dance of Seduction (1993)
Yesterday's Vows (1994)
The Moon Lady's Lover (1994)
If You Loved Me (1999)
The Colors of Love (2000)
Seeing Stars (2001)
Think About Love (2001)

Jenny & Georgina series
Jenny's Turn (1987)
Stray Lady (1987)

MacAvoy series
Takeover Man (1988)
One Secret Too Many (1990)

Gabriola Island series
With Strings Attached (1991)
When Love Returns (1991)

Non fiction
Writing Romance (1997)

References and sources
Vanessa Grant's official website

External links
Vanessa Grant at Fantastic Fiction

Canadian romantic fiction writers
Living people
Year of birth missing (living people)